Historical Jewish Press is an online archive of historical newspapers written and published by Jews. The database enables, through digitization, virtual access to the Hebrew press in most of its years of existence, starting from mid 19th Century to mid 20th Century, along with the Jewish press in Yiddish, Judeo-Arabic, English, French, Ladino, Polish, Russian, Romanian, Spanish, Portuguese, Hungarian and more. The site is a project of the Tel Aviv University and the National Library of Israel.

External links
Historical Jewish Press website 

National Library of Israel
Israeli digital libraries
Jewish newspapers
Mass digitization